Fernando Manuel Silva Leal (born 18 December 1982), commonly known as Nandinho, is a Portuguese futsal player who plays as a winger for São Martinho de Mouros and the Portugal national team.

References

External links

1982 births
Living people
Sportspeople from Porto
Portuguese men's futsal players